Wadas is a village located at the Bener district, Purworejo Regency, Central Java, Indonesia. The village gained attention nationally after recent conflicts between the inhabitants and police forces on 8 February 2022 due to the construction of Bener Dam.

References 

Villages in Central Java
Purworejo Regency